A Not So Silent Night is the fourth studio and first Christmas album from Australian vocal group The Ten Tenors, released in November 2001. The album peaked at number 94 on the ARIA Charts in December 2001, becoming the group's first album to chart within the Australian top 100.

Track listing

Charts

Release history

References

2001 Christmas albums
The Ten Tenors albums
Christmas albums by Australian artists